Israel competed at the 2011 Summer Universiade in Shenzhen, China. The Israeli delegation included 38 athletes, and consisted of men's basketball and men's volleyball teams, as well as 14 individual athletes in athletics, fencing and swimming. Swimmer Guy Barnea was the flag bearer in the opening ceremony, and won the only medal for Israel, a silver in men's 50 m backstroke.

Medals

Medals by sport

Athletics

Danielle Frenkel - women's high jump
Rotem Golan - women's long jump
Yevgeniy Olhovski - men's pole vault

Basketball

Preliminary Group D

Classification 9th-16th Place

Classification 13th-16th Place

13th Place Game

Fencing

Iris Shechtman - women's épée.
Ido Herpe - men's épée
Maor Hatoel - men's foil

Swimming

Men
Guy Barnea 
Itai Chammah
Alon Mandel
Imri Ganiel
Nimrod Hayet
Women
Alisa Tsypin
Keren Siebner
Meredith Budner

Volleyball

Preliminary Group C

|}

|}

Classification 9-16 places

|}

Classification 9-12 places

|}

9th place match

|}

References

Summer Universiade
Nations at the 2011 Summer Universiade
Israel at the Summer Universiade